USBands (formally United States Scholastic Band Association or USSBA)  was formed in the Fall of 1988 to provide high school band programs with a competitive circuit featuring top judges from across the continent and a venue for the US Scholastic Band Championship. It is currently operated by BD Performing Arts.

USBands membership consists of over 700 participating high school marching bands. Annually, bands are offered over 150 festival opportunities and invitations to compete at major Regional Championships and the US Scholastic Band Championship. Bands are classified by size, with Group 1 being the smallest and Group 6 being the largest, and by skill level. The A Class is for inexperienced bands, new bands, and bands that have recently moved to a larger size group. The Open class for established programs.  This results in twelve groups ranging from Group I A to Group VI Open, performing and competing with other bands of like size and talent. USBands has started to support competitive indoor events as well as cooperative fundraising opportunities.  In the winter of 2012, USSBA changed their name to USBands.

Classifications
The USBands allows their bands to classify themselves into three groups in: 
 Performance Class - Ensembles who prefer a non-competitive experience at any USBands sanctioned event.
 A Class - Ensembles who demonstrate a basic to intermediate skill set (may be building/rebuilding their program) and are adjudicated on a scale representing fundamental to intermediate skills. 
 Open Class - Seasoned ensembles that demonstrate expanded skill sets and are adjudicated on a scale supporting intermediate to advanced skills.

Group Size
Bands are grouped by the number of performers on the field. This count includes playing members, auxiliary, and command personnel drum majors.  Group sizes are as follows (new class size breaks used for the 2016 to 2019 seasons): 
 Group I - 1 to 38 members (Texas: 1-45)
 Group II - 39 to 53 members (Texas: 46–80)
 Group III - 54 to 70 members (Texas: 81-115)
 Group IV - 71 to 95 members (Texas: 116–160)
 Group V - 96 to 130 members (Texas: 161–200)
 Group VI -131 and more members (Texas: 201+)

For 2020, USBands created a different group sizing and eliminated "Open Class" as part of its "v-USBands" virtual adjudication platform.  While individual musicians and guard performers along with small ensembles were adjudicated, group Sizes for Marching Bands were as follows:

 Division I - 26 to 50 members
 Division 2 - 51 to 74 members
 Division 3 - 75 to 99 members
 Division 4 - 100 and more members
Bands smaller than 26 members could opt to be adjudicated with Division 1 or as an "Ensemble".

For 2021, "Open" Class has been restored for all Competitions in Texas & beginning with Competitions on September 25 Nationally. Group sizes have been changed as follows:
 Group I - 1 to 39 members (Texas: 1-59)
 Group II - 40 to 59 members (Texas: 60–99)
 Group III - 60 to 79 members (Texas: 100–139)
 Group IV - 80 to 100 members (Texas: 140–169)
 Group V - 101 and more members (Texas: 170+)
Group VI has been eliminated

For 2022, Group sizes have been changed as follows (Texas events group sizing remains the same as 2021):
 Group I - 1 to 39 members (Texas: 1-59)
 Group II - 40 to 54 members (Texas: 60–99)
 Group III - 55 to 74 members (Texas: 100–139)
 Group IV - 75 to 99 members (Texas: 140–169)
 Group V - 100 and more members (Texas: 170+)

Past USBands Open Class champions

Past USBands A Class champions

References

External links

Music organizations based in the United States
Marching band competitions
Educational organizations based in the United States
High school marching bands from the United States
Organizations established in 1988